Daniel "Danny" McKelvie (born 10 October 1969) is a former professional rugby league footballer who played in the 1990s.

International honours
Danny McKelvie won a cap for Scotland while at Dewsbury Rams in 1997 against France (sub).

References

1969 births
Dewsbury Rams players
Place of birth missing (living people)
Scotland national rugby league team players
Living people
Rugby league props